Ainsliaea is a genus of flowering plants in the family Asteraceae described as a genus in 1838.

Ainsliaea is native to East Asia, the Indian Subcontinent, and Southeast Asia.

Species 
 Species

References

Asteraceae genera
Pertyoideae